Ahenaer Adake (born 1 June 1999) is a Chinese speed skater of Kazakh ethnicity.

Ahenaer started with short track speed skating and switched to long track speed skating in 2018.

At the 2019–2020 Junior Speed Skating World Cup, she took the mass start victory in the U23 category twice. She also holds two track records in team pursuit, on the tracks of Milwaukee (USA) and Hulunbuir (CN).

References

External links
 

1999 births
Living people
Sportspeople from Xinjiang
Chinese female speed skaters
Speed skaters at the 2022 Winter Olympics
Kazakhs in China
Olympic speed skaters of China